The Coastal Cliff of northern Chile  stretches over a length of more than 1000 km along the Atacama Desert. It makes up a large part of the western boundary to the Chilean Coast Range in the regions of  Arica y Parinacota, Tarapacá, Antofagasta, and Atacama. According to Roland Paskoff the modern cliff origined from a scarp retreat of a fault scarp, thus at present the cliff does not follow any fault.

In some locations a series of coastal benches can be found below the cliff. Despite alternating uplift and subsidence of the continent at a decadal timescale the cliff and the whole western edge of the South American plate has faced a long-term uplift during the last 2.5 million years.

See also
Atacama Fault
Coastal plains of Chile

References

Cliffs of Chile
Geology of Chile
Landforms of Antofagasta Region
Landforms of Atacama Region
Landforms of Tarapacá Region
Geology of the Chilean Coast Range
Geology of Antofagasta Region
Geology of Atacama Region
Geology of Tarapacá Region
Coasts of Chile
Coasts of Antofagasta Region
Coasts of Tarapacá Region
Coasts of Arica y Parinacota Region
Coasts of Atacama Region